Doumbia is an African surname that may refer to:

Abdou Doumbia, French footballer (born 1990)
Almamy Doumbia, Ivorian footballer (born 1983)
Idrissa Doumbia, Ivorian footballer (born 1998)
Mamadou Doumbia, Ivorian footballer (born 1980)
Mama Koite Doumbia, Malian politician (born 1950)
Moussa Doumbia, Burkinabé footballer (born 1989)
Moussa Doumbia, Malian footballer (born 1994)
Sadio Doumbia, French tennis player (born 1990)
Sékou Doumbia, Ivorian footballer (born 1994)
Seydou Doumbia, Ivorian footballer (born 1987)
Souleyman Doumbia, Ivorian footballer (born 1996)
Tongo Doumbia, Malian footballer (born 1989)
Yahiya Doumbia, Senegalese tennis player (born 1963)